Joyce Patricia Brown (September 7, 1947 - November 29, 2005), also known as Billie Boggs, was a homeless woman who was forcibly hospitalized in New York City in 1987. She was the first person hospitalized under a new Koch administration program which made it easier to forcibly place people in psychiatric hospitals. Between 1987-88, Brown worked with the New York Civil Liberties Union to challenge her hospitalization and ultimately won her release. Her case set legal precedents for involuntary psychiatric care, challenging programs reliant on the practice in New York and elsewhere.

Background 
The 1975 Supreme Court decision O'Connor v. Donaldson limited mandatory hospitalization for mental illness to those who are a danger to themselves or others. Many states passed legislation following the ruling, including New York, which passed its Mental Hygiene Law in 1978, allowing involuntary hospitalization of people with mental illness if they were considered a risk to themselves or others. The case was one part of a larger trend of deinstitutionalization in the mid-to-late-20th century which, combined with other factors like inadequate social programs, led to an increase in homelessness in parts of the United States.   

In New York City, Mayor Ed Koch established a program called Project HELP (Homeless Emergency Liaison Project) in the early 1980s, designed to provide food, clothing, medical, and psychiatric services to homeless people in Manhattan. Sometimes staff would bring people to psychiatric hospitals, but most were not admitted because they did not fit the relatively strict legal requirements. Koch was frustrated that, from the perspective of his staff, there were people who needed help who could not receive it because of the typical interpretation of the law, and began exploring ways to interpret the legal language differently. He was advised the case law might extend the Mental Hygiene Law's concept of "danger to themselves or others" from an immediate sense of danger to a danger in the future. He went out with Project HELP staff to try to understand which people such a redefinition would apply to, and came across Brown. In late 1987, Koch announced a new program for removing homeless people with mental illness from the streets, extending laws about self-harm to include self-neglect and future harm, allocating a unit of space at Bellevue hospital to take care of newly admissible patients. Project HELP's psychiatrists could then direct police officers to take people to a hospital, although involuntary hospitalization was contingent upon not just Project HELP's doctors, but also an emergency room psychiatrist and a psychiatrist at the inpatient facility agreeing that the patient met the criteria. 

The New York Civil Liberties Union (NYCLU, a state branch of the American Civil Liberties Union) was firmly opposed to Koch's program, which they viewed as a violation of the rights of homeless people for the sake of wealthy residents as well as a misguided effort to fix a problem that should be addressed through the development of more affordable housing. Lawyers for the NYCLU started distributing fliers to people living on the street to explain the new program and what rights they had, and to encourage them to reach out for help if they were forcibly hospitalized.

Life prior to hospitalization 
Joyce Patricia Brown was the youngest of six children, born to a working class family in Elizabeth, New Jersey, on September 7, 1947. She worked as a secretary after high school, including a job for the city of Elizabeth, and lived with her parents until 1977. Around the same time, her family began to understand the extent of her psychological struggles. She struggled with several forms of substance abuse, addicted to both heroin and cocaine by the time she was 18, and began to hear voices and act erratically. She was charged with several minor offenses like larceny and possession of heroin, but was arrested for assaulting a police officer at Pennsylvania Station in Newark in 1982. She lived with her sisters in the mid-1980s, moving between their houses as tensions arose. They eventually pooled their money to get her a place of her own instead, but she was soon living in a homeless shelter.

In 1985, after being removed from a shelter in Newark, her sisters took her to East Orange General Hospital for a psychiatric evaluation. She was hospitalized for fifteen days, diagnosed with a form of psychosis likely caused by schizophrenia and prescribed Thorazine. After she was discharged she did not continue her medication. She continued to live between a sister's house and shelters, living on disability benefits. In May 1986, after an argument with her sisters, she left home for Manhattan, and her family did not see her again until she appeared on the news years later.

Brown took up residence on an air vent near Second Avenue at 65th Street by a Swensen's Ice Cream Shop for about a year, during which time she was arrested and released a number of times. She was approached by people with Project HELP, but would not accept their aid. They began monitoring her, checking in regularly, and were concerned about her ability to take care of herself, especially given her inadequate clothing during the cold winter. She was taken to psychiatric hospitals at Project HELP's recommendation three times, each time diagnosed with schizophrenia but released upon determination that she did not pose a danger. She was known to people in the neighborhood for alleged behaviors like running into traffic, exposing herself to passersby, threatening people, screaming at people, tearing up and urinating on money she was given, and defecating on the sidewalk. Neighbors recounted having conversations with her which were frequently pleasant, but could also quickly veer into aggression. On October 28, 1987, the same day the program began, she was the first person involuntarily committed to Bellevue Hospital. She gave false names including "Ann Smith" and "Billie Boggs" (after Bill Boggs, a former local television talk show host in New York City whom she had developed an obsession for years beforehand). The latter was the name widely published in news stories about her case.

Hospitalization and trial 
Brown, whom Koch met during his ride-along with Project HELP, was the first person to be involuntarily committed to a treatment program under the new relaxed requirement. Doctors at Bellevue diagnosed Brown with paranoid schizophrenia and treated her with Haldol and Ativan. Shortly after she regained consciousness on the day after arriving at the hospital, Brown contacted the NYCLU. The organization had been searching for a client which would allow them to challenge the Mayor's program, and staff attorney Robert Levy and Executive Director Norman Siegel were glad to take Brown's case. The case generated extensive media attention from the start. Brown's sisters, who had been looking for her since she left home, went to Bellevue to identify her after recognizing court sketches of her in the news.

In a trial at Bellevue in November 1988, with Acting Supreme Court Justice Robert Lippmann presiding, Levy argued that there was insufficient evidence that Brown was severely mentally ill, and that the behaviors she exhibited may not have been normal or in line with social expectations, but did not meet the requirement set by O'Connor v. Donaldson for posing a danger to oneself or others. Levy reframed the actions that had been offered as evidence of her mental illness as things that lots of people do without being called mentally ill, like urinating where it is convenient or making a social or political statement by burning money. He called multiple witnesses, including Robert Gould of the New York Medical College, to argue that Brown's judgment was limited, but that she was not severely mentally ill. The city's lawyer, supported by four psychiatrists with Project HELP and Bellevue, argued that Brown's mental illness posed a significant risk to herself in that she exhibited suicidal behavior, was antagonistic to the point of provoking violence, and did not wear adequate clothing to survive harsh New York City winters. One of Brown's sisters wanted to testify that she needed to be hospitalized, but the scope of her testimony was limited after objections by Levy that someone who has not seen Brown in years could not speak to her current state. 

Brown herself gave testimony explaining many of her actions, including that she lived on the street because she preferred it to a shelter, that what was characterized as talking to herself she was singing to herself, that she gave false names to avoid her sisters, that she used the sidewalk as a restroom because she was not permitted to use indoor restrooms, and tore up money she was given because she did not want to be mugged for it. She described herself as a "professional" homeless person and argued she should be released. Her clarity and apparent lucidity on the stand became part of the public conversation over whether she needed to be hospitalized. Koch argued that the extent to which Brown was able to clearly present her case was evidence of the effectiveness of treatment, forced or voluntary. Judge Lippmann ruled in her favor, granting her release. In his ruling, he explained that he mostly considered Brown's own testimony because the testimonies of the psychiatrists conflicted with each other so significantly as to be unhelpful. He ultimately determined that regardless of her mental health, "she is not unable to care for her essential needs". 

The Koch administration quickly appealed the decision, and the Appellate Division of the State Supreme Court granted a stay, delaying Brown's release. Brown remained adamant in refusing all care at Bellevue. Lippmann's decision was overruled on appeal, with the court stating that he should have given more weight to the psychiatrists treating her, and less to the NYCLU psychiatrists that only evaluated her in a "structured, safe environment". The appeal was granted on a vote of 3-2, with the dissenting justices arguing that the potential harm Brown posed to herself was too speculative to deprive her of rights. The NYCLU filed an appeal. The city tried to have the hospital force her to take medication, leading to another State Supreme Court hearing at which an independent psychologist, Francine Cournos, testified that Brown had either schizophrenia or manic depression and could benefit from medication. Cournos did not, however, think that medication would be a good idea if it had to be forced, as she had developed a network of people supporting her while forced treatment might lead her to reject all mental health care. On January 15, 1988, State Supreme Court Justice Irving Kirshenbaum agreed with Cournos and ruled that New York City could not forcibly medicate Brown. Unable to provide medication, the city released her. Lawyers for the city and NYCLU alike hoped the State Court of Appeals would better define dangerousness in the context of involuntary hospitalization, but the court declined to rule since Brown's release made it no longer necessary. The result is a definition of dangerous at the city level as defined by the State Supreme Court, but no clarification that applies at the level of state law.

Joyce Brown was released from Bellevue after 84 days, on January 19, 1988.

After release 
According to Rick Hampson of the Associated Press, when Brown was released, she was "the most famous homeless person in America". Her release was a major media event. That night, she appeared on the 5:00 PM broadcast on WNBC, the 6:00 PM broadcast on WCBS, and the 10:00 PM broadcast of WNYW. In all of the interviews, she expressed that she was homeless, not mentally ill, and that she was being held as a "political prisoner". During the WNYW interview, anchorman John Roland, who lived in the same neighborhood as Brown, challenged her, calling her "a mess" and "a disaster" and saying she did not make sense. Negative feedback from viewers led to an apology and five-day suspension, itself leading to negative feedback defending Roland. Among his defenders were Koch and Thomas Dunn, mayor of Elizabeth, who accused the news programs and NYCLU lawyers of exploitation. 

Brown's lawyers secured a space for her at the Traveler's Hotel, a home for formerly homeless women, and arranged for continued psychiatric care. She received donations during her case and continued to make appearances on television news and talk shows. She was interviewed on 60 Minutes, Donahue, People Are Talking on WCBS, and The Morning Show on WABC. She also spoke at a Harvard Law School event called "The Homeless Crisis: A Street View". She received offers about books and movies, as well as job offers. When US President Ronald Reagan met with Soviet leader Mikhail Gorbachev in March 1988, he brought up Brown's case when criticizing the USSR's detention of political dissidents under the guise of treating mental illness.

Two weeks after the Harvard event, Brown was seen panhandling. A New York magazine feature about her published in 1988 noted how frequently people would call out to her when they saw her, to which she would sometimes respond politely and sometimes aggressively. At the time, she spent many of her days at the Port Authority Bus Terminal. She was hospitalized two more times in 1988, and arrested while in possession of heroin. Her release from jail was conditioned on psychiatric treatment.

In 1991, she moved into a supervised group home and was receiving disability benefits, but not taking psychiatric medication. She avoided the press, and attempts by reporters to speak with her caused her distress. The director of the agency that operates her group home and one of Brown's psychiatrists told the Associated Press that the media attention surrounding her case was likely harmful in the long run. 

Joyce Brown died at the age of 58, in 2005.

Legacy 
Jeanie Kasindorf of New York compared Brown's case to that of Bernhard Goetz and the 1984 subway shooting in the extent to which it polarized the city. Some New Yorkers felt the government did not have the right to tell someone they could not live on the street or had to medicate themselves against their will, while others argued someone with severe, untreated mental illness could not make such decisions for themselves or that other citizens had a right, when using city streets, not to contend with the kind of behaviors she exhibited. 

According to Alan Pusey in the ABA Journal, Brown's case sparked national discussion over whether the purpose of forced hospitalization policies was "to help the mentally ill or clear affluent neighborhoods of human nuisance". Alexander Brooks wrote in the Journal of Psychosocial Nursing & Mental Health Services that the case stands in for larger debates over how societies should care for and contend with challenges presented by people with mental illness, with various parties advocating for institutionalization, deinstitutionalization, and bolstering of resources like housing and health care. According to Brooks, "what is needed ... is fewer showcase litigations and more effort made to address the compelling needs of the chronic mentally ill". A case study by Luis R. Marcos likewise said it "exemplifies the politics of implementing controversial public mental health policy and the role the news media can play in the process". In analyzing the initial case in which Brown testified, Marcos also emphasized "the critical role that denial plays in mental illness" whereby "serious mental illness is often characterized by the patient's denial of its existence".

In 2022, Brown's case returned to local news after Mayor Eric Adams announced another compulsory hospitalization program.

References

External links
 New York Times article about the Kirshenbaum hearing and ruling
 New York State Mental Hygiene law, Chapter 27, Title B: Hospitalization of Persons With a Mental Illness

Homeless people
1947 births
2005 deaths
People from New York City
History of mental health in the United States
October 1987 events in the United States
1987 in New York City
1980s controversies in the United States
Involuntary commitment
1988 in New York City
Legal history of New York (state)
Imprisonment and detention in the United States